Ellen Coleman (1886–1973) was an English conductor and composer.

Works
Poem
Cloud and Quietude
The Conquered
The Merry-go-round
String Quartet
Harpsichord Sonata
Piano Quartet

Many of Coleman's works are published by Stainer & Bell.

References

1886 births
1973 deaths
20th-century classical composers
Women classical composers
English classical composers
English conductors (music)
20th-century English composers
20th-century English women musicians
20th-century British conductors (music)
20th-century women composers